Clinical, Cosmetic and Investigational Dermatology is a peer-reviewed medical journal covering research in dermatology. The journal was established in 2008 and is published by Dove Medical Press.

External links 
 

English-language journals
Open access journals
Dove Medical Press academic journals
Publications established in 2008
Dermatology journals